Steven Michael Skala  (born 6 October 1955 in Brisbane, Queensland) is an Australian investment banker, company director, lawyer and philanthropist.

Biography
Mr Skala has a distinguished career of service including on the boards of private, not-for-profit and government organizations and has more than 35 years’ experience in the law, business and banking.

He was appointed Chair of the CEFC in July 2017. He is the Vice Chairman Australia of Deutsche Bank AG, a position he has held since 2004.   A former Chairman of Film Australia Limited, Wilson Group Limited, Hexima Limited, the King Island Company Limited and Blue Chilli Technology Pty Limited, he is also a former Director of the Australian Broadcasting Corporation, the Channel Ten Group of Companies and Max Capital Group Limited.

Prior to becoming an investment banker, Mr Skala was for almost 20 years a senior Partner at the law firm Arnold Bloch Leibler and Head of its Corporate and Commercial practice. Earlier, Mr Skala was for three years a Partner of the Brisbane law firm Morris Fletcher and Cross (now Minter Ellison). He has Arts and Law (Honours) degrees from the University of Queensland and a Bachelor of Civil Law from the University of Oxford.

Active beyond banking and commerce, he is Chairman of the Heide Museum of Modern Art, Deputy Chairman of the General Sir John Monash Foundation, a Director of The Centre for Independent Studies and a Member of the International Council of the Museum of Modern Art (MoMA) in New York. His other not-for-profit roles have included being Chairman of the Australian Centre for Contemporary Art, Deputy Chairman (Vice President) of the Walter & Eliza Hall Institute of Medical Research, a Director of the Australian Ballet and a Founding Panel Member of Adara Advisors Pty Ltd.

On 26 January 2010 Mr Skala was appointed an Officer of the Order of Australia for service to the visual and performing arts through roles supporting wider community access, to business and commerce, and to the community through the promotion of educational opportunities for young Australians.

Mr Skala was appointed Chair of the Board of the Clean Energy Finance Corporation with effect from 7 August 2017 for five years.

Cricket
As a student at Wadham College, Oxford, Skala played two first-class cricket matches for the university, and also appeared in two List A cricket matches for the Combined Universities side which at that time included players from Oxford and Cambridge Universities only. He was a right-handed lower-order batsman and wicketkeeper.

References

External links
 ABC Profile

Living people
Officers of the Order of Australia
Oxford University cricketers
1955 births
People from Brisbane
Alumni of Wadham College, Oxford
Australian cricketers
British Universities cricketers